Stade Francis-Le Blé is a multi-use stadium in Brest, France.  It is currently used mostly for football matches and is the home stadium of Stade Brestois 29. The stadium is able to hold 15,931 spectators. The stadium is named for Francis Le Blé, former mayor of Brest who died in 1982.

References

External links
Stade Brestois 29 Club Website

Francis le Ble
Francis-Le Ble
Sports venues in Finistère
Buildings and structures in Brest, France
Sports venues completed in 1922
1922 establishments in France